The Federal Legislative Council (also known simply as the Legislative Council) was the legislative body of the Federation of Malaya and the predecessor of the Malaysian Parliament. It was formed in 1948 after the abolition of the Malayan Union and the formation of the Federation, as part of the United Kingdom's promise to grant self-rule to the Malayans. The council convened in Kuala Lumpur.

The council was composed of representatives from the Malay, the Chinese and the Indian communities. Initially, all representatives were appointed by the British High Commissioner for Malaya.

In 1955, a general election was held for the first time. 52 seats were contested, with the majority party earning the right to appoint seven more. In the election, the Alliance Party contested all 52 seats and won 51, while the Pan-Malayan Islamic Party won the remaining seat. Following the elections, Raja Uda Raja Muhammad was elected as the Speaker of the Council, similar to the present Speaker of the Dewan Rakyat.

The Federal Legislative Council passed the Malayan Constitution (later, the Malaysian Constitution) on August 15, 1957. Malaya gained independence on August 31, 1957. The Federal Legislative Council continued to sit as the legislative body of the new country until it was dissolved for the 1959 election, in which the new Parliament was elected.

See also
Parliament of Malaysia
Members of the Federal Legislative Council (1955–59)

References

Federation of Malaya
1948 establishments in Malaya
1959 disestablishments in Malaya
Political history of Malaya